São Francisco Futebol Clube, or São Francisco, as they are usually called, is a Brazilian football team from Santarém in Pará, founded on 30 October 1929.

São Francisco is currently ranked eighth among Pará teams in CBF's national club ranking, at 216th place overall.

History

In 1920 the two most successful clubs in the western region of Pará were the Santa Cruz and União Esportiva da Congregação Mariana. By its names already indicated if they were associations connected to the religious movement of the Catholic Church, founded by the priest Frei Ambrósio Phillipsenburg, of the order of the smaller brothers. The União Sportiva was an extremely strong team, able to fight against its great and traditional opponent of the time, the Santa Cruz.

However, the young movement that collaborated with the União Sportiva team, which grew daily with athletes who wanted to play in the club, motivated a group of young people to form a new team that really took care of the needs and paid homage to the illustrious sportsman Frei Ambrósio. On October 30, 1929, the team of the São Francisco was founded, with the purpose of honoring the school founded by the great Santareno footballer of the time, Frei Ambrósio. The founding of the São Francisco Futebol Clube was the event of the year in Santarém and a remarkable way in the history of the sport of the region, since the newly formed team was the best athletes in the city.

After many training in the school camp of the same name, the first game was finally scheduled. It was the first presentation of the already well-assembled and organized football team, which was called: São Francisco Sport Club (first name of the club).

The club's first colors were black and white with horizontal stripes. This fact was registered in the history, due to the lack of option in the local commerce, that did not present other colors available to commercialize. Premised by the circumstances, there was no preference for colors. They used those available.

Supporters
São Francisco is one of the most popular teams in the interior of Pará. In 2010, the club with the biggest crowd in Santarém, created the Socio-Supporter program, its first program of relationship with the supporter. A year later, the program continues to grow its membership, improving its structure, seeking new partnerships and offering more and more recognition to the main partner of São Francisco, the Fan-Partner. An active, passionate and committed partner, the Sócio-Torcedor Azulino is a fundamental collaborator of the club, and receives more and more exclusive benefits, either through discount or exclusivity.

Rivalries
São Francisco biggest rival is São Raimundo.

Stadium

São Francisco play their home games at Estádio Municipal Colosso do Tapajós. The stadium has a maximum capacity of 17,846 people.

Honours
 Campeonato Paraense Second Division
 Winners (1): 1997

References

External links
 São Francisco in OGol.com

Association football clubs established in 1929
São Francisco
1929 establishments in Brazil